Petro Dmytrovych Dolhov (born 29 June 2000) is a professional Ukrainian footballer who plays as a right-back.

References

External links
 Profile on Chornomorets Odesa official website

2000 births
Living people
People from Bolhrad
Ukrainian First League players
Ukrainian Premier League players
FC Chornomorets Odesa players
FC Chornomorets-2 Odesa players
Association football defenders
Ukrainian footballers
Sportspeople from Odesa Oblast